PIF1 5'-to-3' DNA helicase is a protein that in humans is encoded by the PIF1 gene.

Function

This gene encodes a DNA-dependent adenosine triphosphate (ATP)-metabolizing enzyme that functions as a 5' to 3' DNA helicase. The encoded protein can resolve G-quadruplex structures and RNA-DNA hybrids at the ends of chromosomes. It also prevents telomere elongation by inhibiting the actions of telomerase. Alternative splicing and the use of alternative start codons results in multiple isoforms that are differentially localized to either the mitochondria or the nucleus. [provided by RefSeq, Nov 2013].

References

Further reading

External links